Elrod may refer to:

 Elrod (surname), including a list of people with the name
 Elrod, Indiana, an unincorporated community
 Elrod, South Dakota, an unincorporated community